The Moon and Sixpence is a 1942 film adaptation of W. Somerset Maugham's 1919 novel of the same name, which was in part based on the life of the painter Paul Gauguin. Dimitri Tiomkin was nominated for the Academy Award for Best Music, Scoring of a Dramatic or Comedy Picture. Two versions were filmed. In one, Devi Wani, a Javanese actress, played Ata; in the other, Ms. Verdugo played her, to accommodate audiences for whom marriage between a Polynesian and an Englishman was considered unacceptable.

Plot
Geoffrey Wolfe, a writer similar to Maugham, tells the story of Charles Strickland. A mediocre, seemingly unassuming London stockbroker, Strickland suddenly gives up his career, wife of 17 years, and children and moves to Paris. Mrs. Strickland asks Wolfe to bring him back. To Wolfe's surprise, Strickland has not run away with another woman (as he had been told), but because Strickland feels compelled to become a painter. He exhibits no remorse or shame about abandoning his family and refuses to return to his old life, whereupon his wife divorces him. Despite his strong disapproval of Strickland's callous behavior, Wolfe is fascinated.

Several years later, Wolfe is in Paris to see his friend, kindhearted Dirk Stroeve. Stroeve is a bad painter, but an astute judge of others' talent. When Wolfe asks if he knows Strickland, he confidently states that the man is a great painter, even though he has not sold any of his work and barely ekes out a living with odd jobs. However, Stroeve's beloved wife Blanche loathes the man.

Finding Strickland seriously ill near Christmas, Stroeve persuades a very reluctant Blanche to take him into their happy home, promising to nurse him back to health by himself. After six weeks, the artist recovers and makes himself at home, even evicting his host from his own studio. When Stroeve asks him to leave, Blanche unexpectedly announces she is going with him. Stroeve first tries to throttle Strickland. Then, after regaining his composure, he gives the couple the apartment and departs himself.

Later, Strickland discards Blanche (he only accepted her because he wanted to study the female form), and she commits suicide. Even after all this, Stroeve offers to put Strickland up at his mother's home in Holland. He declines.

Wolfe travels to Tahiti, where he learns of Strickland's fate from Captain Nichols and Tiara Johnson. Tiara had arranged a match between Strickland and her young, infatuated cousin Ata. They marry, live happily on Ata's property, and have a child. Strickland paints as much as he wants.

Then Dr. Coutras is sent for. He informs Strickland he has contracted leprosy. Ata refuses to leave him, braving the hostility of their neighbors, though she eventually entrusts their child to others. Two years later, Coutras is summoned again. He is too late; Strickland is dead. Entering the now dilapidated house, Coutras is awestruck by the paintings adorning all of the interior, recognizing despite his lack of knowledge of art that Strickland has created masterpieces. Ata, however, burns the house down, fulfilling a promise extracted by her husband.

Cast

Preservation status
Because this film was independently produced, it was unavailable for many years after the initial release and 1948 re-release. On December 14, 2011, Turner Classic Movies aired a restored print from George Eastman House which includes the tinted scenes in Tahiti and the final reel in Technicolor (the scenes in London and Paris are in black and white).

References

External links
 
 
 
 
 

1942 films
1942 drama films
American drama films
Films about fictional painters
Films based on British novels
Films scored by Dimitri Tiomkin
Films directed by Albert Lewin
Films produced by David L. Loew
Films set in French Polynesia
Films set in Paris
Films based on works by W. Somerset Maugham
United Artists films
1942 directorial debut films
1940s English-language films
1940s American films